A ghanjah or ganja, also known as kotiya in India, is a large wooden trading dhow, a traditional Arabic sailing vessel.

Description
The ghanjah dhows had a curved prow with a characteristic trefoil ornament carved on top of the stem-head. They also had an ornately carved stern and quarter galleries.
Usually they had two masts, the main mast having a pronounced inclination towards the prow. They used two to three lateen sails; supplementary sails were often added on the bowsprit and on a topmast atop the main mast.

The ghanjah is often difficult to distinguish from the baghlah, a similar type of dhow. Besides the trefoil-shaped carving on top of the stem-head, ghanjahs had usually a more slender shape.

History
Ghanjahs were widely used in the past centuries as merchant ships in the Indian Ocean between the western coast of the Indian Subcontinent and the Arabian Peninsula. Many ghanjahs were built at traditional shipyards in Sur, Oman, as well as in Beypore, Kerala, India.

Ghanjahs were largely replaced by the newer-designed and easier to maneuver booms in the 20th century.

See also
Dhow
Baghlah
Shu'ai

References

External links

Ghanjah and baghlah
Hikoichi Yajima, The Arab dhow trade in the Indian Ocean : preliminary report
Dhows
The Historic Dhow 
The Dhow of Racing

Dhow types
Arabic words and phrases
Sailing ships
Arab inventions
Tall ships